GNUmed is a  Free/Libre electronic medical record (EMR) for Unix-like systems (BSD, Linux, and UNIX systems), Microsoft Windows, macOS and other platforms. GNUmed aims to provide medical software that respects the privacy of patients and that is based on open standards.

GNUmed is based on third party projects such as free software/open source DBMS  PostgreSQL and is written mostly in Python. It is supported by a graphical user interface (GUI) based on WxPython.

History
The first version of the GNUmed was created by Horst Herb.  When Herb ceased active development, the development of GNUmed was picked up by Karsten Hilbert who took over as project leader and partly overhauled the project.

Karsten Hilbert was not alone in his efforts. Several other developers joined the team and helped at one time or the other: Syan Tan, Ian Haywood, Hilmar Berger, Sebastian Hilbert, Carlos Moro, Michael Bonert, Richard Terry, Tony Lembke and many more. While some concentrated on coding, many others, like Jim Busser and Rogerio Luz Coelho helped by creating documentation or by submitting other comments.

The name was initially chosen to give credit to the GNU project and GNUmed's connection to the medical profession. The logo depicts a Gnu as a reference to the GNU project accompanied by a Python as a reference to the programming language as well as to the medical profession.

At the time, GNUmed was just another free software project aiming to become an alternative to the established EMRs. It has since evolved to rival other EMRs in terms of functionality and performance.

Usage
GNUmed is primarily used to manage electronic medical records. It provides means of archiving paper records as well as collecting metadata on these records. Some uses include administrative tasks such as adding and activating patients, and recording tasks such as data on patients' allergies or immunization records.

Features
GNUmed supports a variety of features, many implemented as plugins which extend the core functionality.  These can range a medical paper record archiving system to vaccination status handling. A list of features is provided in GNUmed's documentation system.

By making use of GNUmed's interface 3rd party software can interact with GNUmed to make use of its features.

See also 

 List of GNU packages
 GNU Project
 GNU Health

References

General references

Further reading

External links
 

GNU Project software
Free health care software
Electronic health record software
Healthcare software for macOS
Healthcare software for Windows
Healthcare software for Linux
Software that uses wxPython